South Carolina Memorial Garden is a historic memorial garden located at Columbia, South Carolina. It was established in 1944-1945 by the Garden Club of South Carolina.  It was designed by noted landscape architect Loutrel W. Briggs (1893-1977).  It includes a variety of ornamental plants and complementary design elements such as a gate house or tea room (1957), tool house or gardener's shed (1949-1951), walls (1948), gates (1948), walks, fountain terrace and fountain (1951-1952), sculpture (1952, 1954), and garden furniture.  It was the first memorial garden sponsored by a state garden club in the United States that recognized veterans of World War II.

It was added to the National Register of Historic Places in 2012.

References

World War II memorials in the United States
Parks on the National Register of Historic Places in South Carolina
Buildings and structures completed in 1957
Buildings and structures in Columbia, South Carolina
National Register of Historic Places in Columbia, South Carolina